Bankers Hill, also known as Park West and formerly known as Florence Heights, is a long-established uptown San Diego neighborhood near Balboa Park.  It is bordered to the north by Hillcrest at Upas Street, to the south by Downtown (at Interstate 5, the San Diego Freeway), to the east by Balboa Park, and to the west by Interstate 5, Little Italy and the neighborhood known as Midtown. A more constricted definition of the neighborhood sets its eastern boundary as Fourth Avenue and its western boundary as First Avenue.

The area is primarily residential south of Laurel Street and west of Fifth Avenue. There is a small commercial district along First Avenue between Hawthorne and Juniper Streets. There are multiple high-rise condominiums along Fifth and Sixth Avenue facing the park.  Locations further west allow an elevated, panoramic view of Downtown, San Diego Bay, the airport, Coronado, Harbor Island and Mount Soledad. Many homes date from the late 19th century, some of which have been restored as offices or bed-and-breakfasts. Architects Irving Gill, William Hebbard, Richard Requa and Frank Mead designed homes in this area. The area acquired the name "Bankers Hill" because of its reputation as a home for the affluent.

References

External links
 Bankers Hill/Park West | Councilmember Stephen Whitburn (District 3) | City of San Diego Official Website
 Bankers Hill Community Group

Neighborhoods in San Diego